Nude & Rude: The Best of Iggy Pop is a compilation album by Iggy Pop. It was released in 1996 on Virgin Records. The album was superseded by A Million in Prizes: The Anthology.

Track listing

Charts

Certifications

References 

Iggy Pop compilation albums
1996 compilation albums
Virgin Records compilation albums